The Si La (also Sila or Syla) are an ethnic group of about 3,151 people living in northern Laos and another 600 living in two villages:  Nậm Sin and Seo Hay of Lai Châu Province, Northwest region, Vietnam.

Culture 
The Si La people speak a Tibeto-Burman language closely related to Hani (Edmondson 2002). Their primary occupation is the cultivation of cereals, augmented by hunting and foraging. One of the most distinctive Si La customs is tooth painting: men traditionally painted their teeth red, while women painted theirs black. The custom is increasingly uncommon among the younger generation.

References

Ethnic groups in Laos
Ethnic groups in Vietnam